Neptis miah, the small yellow sailer, is a nymphalid butterfly found in India, Bhutan, Thailand, and Malaysia eastward to western China, Hainan and Guangdong. Seven subspecies have been identified. The Guangdong subspecies belongs to N. miah disopa Swinhoe and the Hainan subspecies is considered as N. miah nolana Druce.

The whole Neptini tribe is a difficult group and many species are alike. In fact, there may be a few unrecorded species flying in Hong Kong, which may be mistaken as the common N. hordonia or other brownish Neptis, like N. clinia Moore.

References 

miah
Butterflies of Asia
Butterflies of Indochina
Butterflies described in 1858